Lars Johansson may refer to:

 Lars (Lasse) Johansson (1638–1674), also known as Lucidor, Swedish baroque poet
 Lars Johansson (politician) (born 1950), member of the Riksdag
 Lars Johansson (musician), lead guitarist of Swedish doom metal band Candlemass
 Lars Johansson (bandy) (born 1976), Swedish bandy player
 Lars Johansson (ice hockey) (born 1987), Swedish ice hockey goaltender
 Lars Johansson (footballer), Swedish footballer
 Lars Johansson (sailor) (born 1953), Swedish Olympic sailor
 Lars Johansson (canoeist)
 Lars Johansson (basketball)